Kharabeh Khvoshrud Pey (also Romanized as Kharābeh Khvoshrūd Pey; also known as Khoshkrūd Pey) is a village in Khvosh Rud Rural District, Bandpey-ye Gharbi District, Babol County, Mazandaran Province, Iran. At the 2006 census, its population was 139, in 28 families.

References 

Populated places in Babol County